Mahlon "Sandy" Apgar IV (born 14 January 1941) is a housing, infrastructure, and real estate consultant to global corporations and government agencies, and a non-resident Senior Advisor at the Center for Strategic and International Studies (CSIS). He is known as the "father" of the US Army's housing privatization program, the largest such public-private partnership program in the Department of Defense. He was a partner and senior advisor at the Boston Consulting Group (BCG), and a partner at McKinsey & Company where he led its operations in Saudi Arabia, and a Senior Scholar at the Woodrow Wilson International Center for Scholars where he wrote the playbook on public-private partnerships.

Education and military service 
Born in Paterson, New Jersey, Apgar graduated from Blair Academy in 1958, and in 1962 received a BA in Sociology from Dartmouth College, where he was a Choate Scholar and a Distinguished Military Graduate of Army ROTC. He spent his senior year with the Dartmouth-MIT Program In Urban Studies, examining Boston's cultural institutions as paths to upward mobility. As a member of Delta Tau Delta fraternity, he helped lead the chapter's break from the national organization due to its discriminatory admissions policy. In 1962, he was commissioned in the US Army and served as an intelligence officer covering the East-West German border until 1965. The following year, he studied the British New Towns program at Oxford University. In 1968, he received an MBA from the Harvard Business School, as a National Fellow and Executive Editor of The MBA magazine.

Consulting career 
Apgar began his real estate career with the developer James W. Rouse, and assisted in opening the new city of Columbia, Maryland. In 1968, he joined McKinsey, transferring to London in 1970, where he consulted on British and European housing, real estate, urban development, and local government issues. He wrote policy guidelines called The Sunderland Study: Tackling Urban Problems for the UK government, and advised private firms on real estate strategy. In 1974, he began a five-year engagement in Saudi Arabia, leading planning teams for Saudi Aramco's large-scale community development and infrastructure expansion, and co-authoring a blueprint for the Saudi government's national urbanization strategy. In 1980, he founded Apgar & Company, an advisory firm specializing in large-scale corporate real estate strategy and management. In 1997, he patented a corporate real estate evaluation system known as the Apgar Real Estate Score.

In 1998, President Bill Clinton appointed him Assistant Secretary of the Army for Installations and Environment, with global responsibility for the Army's housing, real estate and facilities. In that role, he established the Residential Communities Initiative (RCI) to privatize military housing, and led negotiations for the Army with the National Trust for Historic Preservation to restructure the management of 70,000 historic military properties. From 2002 to 2006, Apgar was a partner and director of BCG, where he established the Infrastructure and Real Estate practice. He was the firm's senior advisor on real estate from 2007 to 2011. He has advised over 200 companies, institutions and governments in 13 countries on some 600 projects, including Irvine and Playa Vista, California; Brandermill, Virginia; Disney World; Hull, London, and Sunderland in the United Kingdom; the Villes Nouvelles in France; and business new communities in Japan.

Affiliations, publications, awards  
Apgar is a Counselor of Real Estate, a Member of the Business Executives for National Security Advisory Board, a Fellow of the Royal Institution of Chartered Surveyors, the Institute of Directors, and the Royal Society of Arts, a Trustee of the Urban Land Institute, and a Governor of the ULI Foundation. He has taught courses at Harvard, Oxford, Princeton, and Yale. He has edited two books, including New Perspectives on Community Development, and authored more than 150 publications, including feature articles for the Harvard Business Review. Apgar received the Army's Decoration for Distinguished Civilian Service, the first Chairman's Award of the President's Advisory Council on Historic Preservation and the Arthur A. May Award of the American Institute of Real Estate Appraisers, now The Appraisal Institute. He received the William S. Ballard Award and is the only two-time recipient of the James Felt Award for Creative Counseling, both from the Counselors of Real Estate. He and his wife, Anne, established a teaching excellence awards program in 1982.

References 

 Oxford Said Business School – Associate Fellow Biography 
 "The Alternative Workplace: Changing Where and How People Work," Harvard Business Review, May–June 1998, Vol. 76, No. 3, pp. 121–136.
 "Managing Real Estate to Build Value," Harvard Business Review, November–December 1995, Vol. 73, No. 6, pp. 162–179.
 Mastering Urban Growth: A Blueprint for Management, McKinsey International, Inc. for the Ministry of Municipal and Rural Affairs, Riyadh, Saudi Arabia, 1978.
 "New Business with the New Military" (with John M. Keane), Harvard Business Review, September 2004, Vol. 82, No. 9, pp. 45–56.
 New Perspectives on Community Development, London/New York: McGraw Hill, 1976.  Editor.  Author of Introduction; Chapter 4, "Guiding the Development Enterprise", pp. 77–98; Chapter 5, "Developing the Project Strategy", pp. 99–128; Chapter 6, "Planning for Community Management", pp. 129–156; Chapter 7, "Mastering Development Economics", pp. 157–187.
 The Promise of Public-Private Partnerships: Principles and Proposals for the Next President, Report of the Forum on Privatization and Partnerships, Woodrow Wilson International Center for Scholars, Washington, DC, August 2008.
 "Succeeding in Saudi Arabia," Harvard Business Review, January–February 1977, Vol. 55, No. 1.
 The Sunderland Study: Tackling Urban Problems (Volume 1) and A Working Guide (Volume 2), Her Majesty's Stationery Office, London, 1973.
 "Uncovering Your Hidden Occupancy Costs," Harvard Business Review, May–June 1993, Vol. 71, No. 3, pp. 124–136.

1941 births
Living people
People from Paterson, New Jersey
Blair Academy alumni
Dartmouth College alumni
United States Army officers
Harvard Business School alumni
McKinsey & Company people
United States Assistant Secretaries of the Army
Boston Consulting Group people
Assistant Secretaries of the Army for Installations, Energy and Environment
Military personnel from New Jersey